Anthony David Winchester (born May 15, 1983) is an American basketball coach and former professional basketball player. Winchester is currently an assistant coach at Kansas State. He played college basketball at Western Kentucky.

High school career
Winchester attended Austin High School. He averaged 34.7 points per game as a senior and led Austin to the 2002 2A Final Four and Mid-Southern Conference Championship. Winchester was the runner-up for Indiana Mr. Basketball. He finished his career with 2,256 points.

College career
Winchester played college basketball at Western Kentucky. In February 2004, he scored 40 points in a loss to Louisiana-Lafayette. He averaged 18.2 points and 7.2 rebounds per game as a junior, despite playing out of position at power forward due to injuries. As a senior, Winchester averaged 18.5 points, 5.3 rebounds, 2.5 assists and 1 steal per game. He was named Sun Belt Player of the Year and Honorable Mention All-American. Winchester concluded his college career with 1,732 points.

Professional career
Winchester was selected by the Dodge City Legend with the fourth pick of the 2006 USBL draft. In August 2006, he signed with Club Melilla Baloncesto of the Spanish LEB Oro. Winchester led the team with 12.8 points per game and was twice named Player of the Month. He joined CB Atapuerca for the 2007-08 season but suffered a back injury in October 2007. He decided not to play professionally for five years, citing lack of motivation. In 2012, Winchester signed with CB Breogán. He averaged 15.3 points per game and was named Guard of the Year. Winchester joined Gipuzkoa Basket for the 2013-14 season and averaged 10.2 points per game.

Coaching career
Winchester became an assistant coach at Bowling Green High School for the 2007-2008 season. In 2008, he joined Ken McDonald's staff at Western Kentucky as a graduate assistant. He was promoted to director of operations for the 2009-10 season. In July 2010, Winchester was hired as the head coach of Scottsburg Senior High School. In his only season, the Warriors finished 3-18.

Winchester served as a graduate assistant at Loyola Marymount during the 2018-19 season. In May 2019, he joined Southern Miss as a video coordinator. Winchester was inducted into Western Kentucky's Athletic Hall of Fame in October 2019. He joined Pacific as the director of operations for the 2020-21 season. In August 2021, Winchester was hired as an assistant coach at Southern Miss.

References

External links

Southern Miss Golden Eagles bio

1983 births
Living people
American expatriate basketball people in Spain
American men's basketball coaches
American men's basketball players
Atléticos de San Germán players
Basketball coaches from Indiana
Basketball players from Indiana
CB Breogán players
Gipuzkoa Basket players
High school basketball coaches in Indiana
High school basketball coaches in Kentucky
Loyola Marymount Lions men's basketball coaches
Melilla Baloncesto players
Pacific Tigers men's basketball coaches
People from Seymour, Indiana
Shooting guards
Southern Miss Golden Eagles basketball coaches
Western Kentucky Hilltoppers basketball coaches
Western Kentucky Hilltoppers basketball players